The Slipper and the Rose – The Story of Cinderella is a musical theatre retelling of the classic fairy tale Cinderella. Originally made as a musical film, the stage version was created in 1984 by Philip Burley. It runs for approximately two and a half hours over two acts and an intermission.

Plot
Based on the original Cinderella fairy-tale, the story revolves around a central theme of love between Prince Edward of Euphrania and Cinderella. There are also elements of wish fulfillment notably conveyed through the character of the Fairy Godmother.

The story begins with Edward's unsuccessful search for a bride and ends with love fulfilled as Prince Edward and Cinderella marry. The plot contains many elements from the well known Cinderella story (a bride-finding ball, fitting the slipper for example), with additional twists (a betrayal).

Characters

 Cinderella
 Prince Edward
 the Stepmother
 the King
 the Queen
 the Dowager Queen

 the Fairy Godmother
 the Lord High Chamberlain
 John, the Prince Edward's valet and friend
 the Duke of Montague, cousin to the Prince
 Isobella, Stepsister
 Palatine, Stepsister

Synopsis of Scenes

Act I
 Prologue - Graveyard/Palace stable yard
 Scene 1 - Interior of Cinderella's House
 Scene 2 - Interior of Palace
 Scene 3 - Graveyard
 Scene 4 - Cinderella's Kitchen
 Scene 5(a) - Field
 Scene 5 - Interior of Palace
 Scene 6 - Hallway of Cinderella's House
 Scene 7(a) - A Bedroom at the Palace (insert)
 Scene 7(b) - Interior of Dress Shop (insert)
 Scene 8 - Cinderella's Kitchen
 Scene 8(b) - Fairy Godmother's Hideaway (insert)

Act II
 Scene 1 - Interior of Palace
 Scene 1(b) - Field
 Scene 2 - Hallway of Cinderella's House
 Scene 3 - Interior of Palace
 Scene 3(a) - Street
 Scene 4 - Interior of palace
 Scene 5 - Field
 Scene 5(a) - A Bedroom at the Palace (insert)
 Scene 6 - Interior of Palace
 Scene 7 - Faraway
 Scene 8 - The Cathedral

Songs

 Overture
 "Why Can't I Be Two People?"
 "What Has Love Got to Do With Getting Married?"
 "Once I Was Loved"
 "What a Comforting Thing to Know"
 "Protocoligorically Correct"
 "Bride-Finding Ball"
 "Suddenly It Happens"
 "The Slipper and the Rose Waltz Theme" (an instrumental version of "He Danced With Me")

 "Secret Kingdom"
 "He Danced With Me/She Danced With Me"
 "Position and Positioning"
 "Tell Him Anything (But Not That I Love Him)"
 "I Can't Forget the Melody"
 "Secret Kingdom (Reprise)"

Productions

United Kingdom
Epsom Light Opera Company staged the premiere of the musical from 10 to 14 October 2000 at Epsom Playhouse, directed by Philip Burley. Later UK productions have included stagings in 2001 by the Bilston Operatic Company in Wolverhampton, in May 2008 at the Minack Theatre in Cornwall, in April 2011 at the York Theatre Royal, and in November 2013 by BOST Musicals at the Liverpool Empire Theatre.

North America

United States
The musical was given its US premiere in February 2005 at the Hale Center Theatre in West Valley City, Utah. A production ran in November to December 2008 at the Tacoma Musical Playhouse in Tacoma, Washington.

Canada
The Slipper and the Rose was staged in 2011 by Productions Coracole at the Beaubois Theatre in Montreal, Quebec.

See also 

 The Slipper and the Rose (1976 film)
 National Operatic and Dramatic Association

References

External links 
 
 Information from the National Operatic and Dramatic Association (NODA)
 Bilston Operatic Company
 York Theatre Royal
 Les Productions Coracole (Montreal, Quebec, Canada) website showcasing their recent presentation of The Slipper and the Rose.
 Reference at guidetomusicaltheatre.com

1984 musicals
Fantasy theatre
Musicals based on films
Musicals based on works by Charles Perrault
Musicals by the Sherman Brothers
Plays based on fairy tales
Works based on Cinderella